is an archaeology museum located in the outskirts of the city of Wakayama, Wakayama Prefecture, Japan. It was opened in August 1971 with the main purpose of preserving, researching, and displaying artifacts from the Iwase-Senzuka Kofun Cluster, a Special National Historic Site. 

The museum encompasses a 65 hectare area containing about 400 kofun burial mounds, restored pit dwellings, relocated old folk houses of the Edo period (including two which are designated Important Cultural Properties, and a botanical garden. The museum building itself was built by donations from Matsushita Konosuke, the industrialist who founded Panasonic, and is styled after a raised-floor warehouse from the Yayoi period, and is covered with the same type of stone used in the burial chambers of the tumuli in the adjacent Iwase-Senzuka Kofun Cluster. The museum contains items excavated from these kofun, as well as pottery excavated from the ruins of Negoro-ji and other locations and folk implements.

Gallery

See also

 Wakayama Prefectural Museum
 List of Cultural Properties of Japan - archaeological materials (Wakayama)

References

External links

Wakayama Prefecture Kii-fudoki-no-oka Museum of Archaeology and Folklore  

Museums in Wakayama Prefecture
Wakayama (city)
Archaeological museums in Japan
Museums established in 1971
1971 establishments in Japan